John Eddie Long (born August 28, 1956) is an American former professional basketball player.

Amateur career
Long played high school basketball at Romulus High School, and signed to play for Dick Vitale at the University of Detroit.  Long established himself quickly with a Detroit program that would produce an unprecedented run during his time with the Titans (1974-1978).  Vitale added future NBA players such as Terry Duerod, Terry Tyler and Dennis Boyd and built a dominating independent program at the Jesuit university.  Long played shooting guard for the team, averaging 23.3 ppg on a .525 shooting percentage as a senior.

UD advanced to the 1977 NCAA Division I Basketball Tournament in his junior year, defeating Middle Tennessee in the first round before losing to Michigan in the Sweet 16 86-81 to end a stellar season, finishing #12 in the polls.

The team was left out of the NCAA in Longs's senior year, 1977–78, playing in the 1978 NIT, despite a 25-4 record and a #18 ranking.  In four seasons at Detroit, Long scored 2,167 points, the first Titan to score more than 2000 points, and was inducted into the Detroit Mercy Titans Hall of Fame in 1993.

Professional career
After starring at the University of Detroit, the shooting guard was selected by the Detroit Pistons in the second round of the 1978 NBA draft. The move was largely influenced by Pistons Head Coach Dick Vitale, who coached Long at UD before going to the Pistons in 1978. He played eight seasons for the Pistons, and averaged a career-high 21.9 points per game in 1981–82. Long was the original backcourt partner to point guard Isiah Thomas before Joe Dumars was drafted.  During his time with the Pistons, Long would also play alongside University of Detroit teammates Duerod, Boyd and Tyler. On December 13, 1983, Long scored 41 points, recorded eight assists, and grabbed six rebounds during a 186–184 triple overtime win over the Denver Nuggets.

Long left Detroit to play for the Indiana Pacers in 1986, where he paired with Reggie Miller, and then returned to the Pistons in the 1988-89 Detroit Pistons season, helping the team win the NBA championship.  He spent the next season with the Atlanta Hawks and then returned to Detroit in 1990-91, played in France, the Continental Basketball Association, and even played with a touring team for Magic Johnson.  Not done, Long signed with the Toronto Raptors in 1996, played with the Raptors for one season, and then retired in 1997 with 12,131 career points.  At the time, the 41-year-old Long was the second oldest player in the NBA behind Robert Parish, who was 43.

Personal life
Two of John Long's nephews, Terry Mills and Grant Long, also played in the NBA. The nephews were teammates in Detroit during the 1996–1997 season. All three men played two seasons or more for the Detroit Pistons.  Long has worked as a radio analyst for the Pistons.

Long was inducted into the Michigan Sports Hall of Fame in 2016.

NBA career statistics

Regular season 

|-
| style="text-align:left;"| 
| style="text-align:left;"|Detroit
| 82 || – || 30.5 || .469 || – || .826 || 3.2 || 1.5 || 1.2 || 0.2 || 16.1
|-
| style="text-align:left;"| 
| style="text-align:left;"|Detroit
| 69 || – || 34.3 || .505 || .083 || .825 || 4.9 || 3.0 || 1.9 || 0.4 || 19.4
|-
| style="text-align:left;"| 
| style="text-align:left;"|Detroit
| 59 || – || 29.7 || .461 || .182 || .870 || 3.3 || 1.8 || 1.6 || 0.4 || 17.7
|-
| style="text-align:left;"| 
| style="text-align:left;"|Detroit
| 69 || 66 || 32.0 || .492 || .133 || .865 || 3.7 || 2.1 || 0.9 || 0.4 || 21.9
|-
| style="text-align:left;"| 
| style="text-align:left;"|Detroit
| 70 || 30 || 21.2 || .451 || .286 || .760 || 2.6 || 1.5 || 0.6 || 0.2 || 10.5
|-
| style="text-align:left;"| 
| style="text-align:left;"|Detroit
| 82 || 82 || 30.7 || .472 || .200 || .884 || 3.5 || 2.5 || 1.1 || 0.2 || 16.3
|-
| style="text-align:left;"| 
| style="text-align:left;"|Detroit
| 66 || 55 || 27.6 || .487 || .333 || .862 || 2.9 || 2.0 || 1.1 || 0.2 || 14.7
|-
| style="text-align:left;"| 
| style="text-align:left;"|Detroit
| 62 || 30 || 19.0 || .482 || .188 || .856 || 1.6 || 1.3 || 0.7 || 0.2 || 10.0
|-
| style="text-align:left;"| 
| style="text-align:left;"|Indiana
| 80 || 68 || 28.3 || .419 || .284 || .890 || 2.7 || 3.2 || 1.2 || 0.1 || 15.2
|-
| style="text-align:left;"| 
| style="text-align:left;"|Indiana
| 81 || 81 || 25.0 || .474 || .442 || .907 || 2.8 || 2.1 || 1.0 || 0.1 || 12.8
|-
| style="text-align:left;"| 
| style="text-align:left;"|Indiana
| 44 || 1 || 17.4 || .401 || .400 || .937 || 1.5 || 1.5 || 0.7 || 0.0 || 7.3
|-
| style="text-align:left;background:#afe6ba;"| †
| style="text-align:left;"|Detroit
| 24 || 0 || 6.3 || .475 || – || .846 || 0.5 || 0.6 || 0.0 || 0.1 || 2.0
|-
| style="text-align:left;"| 
| style="text-align:left;"|Atlanta
| 48 || 19 || 21.5 || .453 || .345 || .836 || 1.7 || 1.8 || 0.9 || 0.1 || 8.4
|-
| style="text-align:left;"| 
| style="text-align:left;"|Detroit
| 25 || 0 || 10.2 || .412 || .333 || .960 || 1.3 || 0.7 || 0.4 || 0.1 || 3.8
|-
| style="text-align:left;"| 
| style="text-align:left;"|Toronto
| 32 || 0 || 11.6 || .393 || .353 || .893 || 1.3 || 0.7 || 0.3 || 0.1 || 4.0
|- class="sortbottom"
| style="text-align:center;" colspan="2"| Career
| 893 || 432 || 25.4 || .467 || .322 || .862 || 2.8 || 1.9 || 1.0 || 0.2 || 13.6

Playoffs 

|-
|style="text-align:left;"|1984
|style="text-align:left;"|Detroit
|5||–||29.8||.364||.000||1.000||2.2||0.4||1.4||0.0||11.0
|-
|style="text-align:left;"|1985
|style="text-align:left;"|Detroit
|9||9||28.3||.457||.250||1.000||1.9||1.4||1.6||0.2||12.4
|-
|style="text-align:left;"|1986
|style="text-align:left;"|Detroit
|1||0||13.0||.400||–||1.000||1.0||0.0||1.0||0.0||7.0
|-
|style="text-align:left;"|1987
|style="text-align:left;"|Indiana
|4||4||27.3||.308||.167||.846||1.5||2.3||1.5||0.0||11.0
|-
| style="text-align:left;background:#afe6ba;"|1989†
|style="text-align:left;"|Detroit
|4||0||2.0||1.000||–||1.000||0.0||0.0||0.0||0.0||1.3
|- class="sortbottom"
| style="text-align:center;" colspan="2"| Career
| 23 || 13 || 23.2 || .399 || .182 || .959 || 1.5 || 1.0 || 1.2 || 0.1 || 9.7

Notes

External links
Career Stats

1956 births
Living people
African-American basketball players
American expatriate basketball people in Canada
American expatriate basketball people in France
American men's basketball players
Atlanta Hawks players
Basketball players from Michigan
Detroit Pistons announcers
Detroit Pistons draft picks
Detroit Pistons players
Detroit Mercy Titans men's basketball players
Indiana Pacers players
People from Romulus, Michigan
Shooting guards
Sioux Falls Skyforce (CBA) players
Toronto Raptors players
Romulus Senior High School alumni
21st-century African-American people
20th-century African-American sportspeople